Violet Street is the fourth studio album by American band Local Natives. It was released on April 26, 2019 through Loma Vista Recordings.

Track listing

Personnel
Credits adapted from LP liner notes.

Local Natives
 Taylor Rice – vocals, guitar 
 Kelcey Ayer – vocals, keyboards, percussion, guitar 
 Ryan Hahn – guitar, keyboards, vocals 
 Matt Frazier – drums
 Nik Ewing – bass, keyboards, vocals

Production and additional personnel
 Shawn Everett - producer, mixing, engineer
 David Gaume - engineer
 Fernando Navarro - engineer
 Ivan Wayman - engineer
 Omar Yakar - engineer
 Chris Bellman - vinyl cut
 Bob Ludwig - mastering
 Sarah Neufeld - strings on "Vogue"
 Rob Moose - string arrangements on "Café Amarillo" and "Garden of Elysian"
 Olivia Walker - additional vocals on "Café Amarillo"
 Anjolee Williams - additional vocals on "Café Amarillo"
 Asdru Sierra  - horns on "Shy"
 Public-Library - art direction & design
 Allister Ann - photography
 Jonathan Chu - photography
 Huy Doan - photography
 Drew Escriva - photography
 Phil Costello - artist representation/management

Charts

References

2019 albums
Local Natives albums
Loma Vista Recordings albums